The Treaty of Turkmenchay was an agreement between Qajar Iran and the Russian Empire, which concluded the Russo-Persian War (1826–1828). It was second of the series of treaties (the first was the 1813 Treaty of Gulistan and the last, the 1881 Treaty of Akhal) signed between Qajar Iran and Imperial Russia that forced Persia to cede or recognize Russian influence over the territories that formerly were part of Iran.  

The treaty was signed on 21 February 1828 (5 Sha'ban 1243) in Torkamanchay (a village between Tabriz and Tehran). It made Persia cede the control of several areas in the South Caucasus to Russia: the Erivan Khanate, the Nakhchivan Khanate and the remainder of the Talysh Khanate. The boundary between Russia and Persia was set at the Aras River. The territories are now Armenia, the south of the Republic of Azerbaijan, Nakhchivan and Iğdır Province (now part of Turkey).

The treaty was signed for Persia by the Crown Prince Abbas Mirza and Allah-Yar Khan Asaf al-Daula, chancellor to Shah Fath Ali (of the Qajar dynasty), and for Russia by General Ivan Paskievich. Similarly to the 1813 Treaty of Gulistan, the treaty was imposed on Persia following a Russian military victory. Paskievich threatened to occupy Tehran in five days unless the treaty was signed.

Following this treaty, as well as the Treaty of Gulistan, Russia had finished conquering all the Caucasus territories from Qajar Iran what is now Dagestan, eastern Georgia, Azerbaijan, and Armenia, all of which had formed part of its very concept for centuries. The areas north of the Aras River, such as the territory of the contemporary nations of Georgia, Azerbaijan, Armenia and the North Caucasian Republic of Dagestan, were Iranian until they were occupied by Russia during the 19th century.

Following the two treaties, the formerly Iranian territories came under the Russian, and later the Soviet control for approximately 180 years, and Dagestan remains a constituent republic within the Russian Federation to this day. Comprising most of the territory ceded in Gulistan and Turkmenchay treaties, three separate nations would gain independence following the dissolution of the Soviet Union in 1991: Georgia, Azerbaijan and Armenia.

Terms

The terms of the treaty are as follow: 

 Article 4: Persia ceded the Erivan Khanate (most of present-day central Armenia), the Nakhchivan Khanate (most of the present-day Nakhchivan Autonomous Republic of Azerbaijan), the Talysh Khanate (southeastern Azerbaijan), and the Ordubad and Mughan regions (now also part of Azerbaijan) and also reiterated the cessions made to Russia in the Treaty of Gulistan
 Article 6: Persia promised to pay Russia 10 korur in gold or 20 million silver rubles (in 1828 currency).
Article 7: Russia promised to support Abbas Mirza as the heir to the throne of Persia on the death of Shah Fath Ali. (The clause became moot when Abbas Mirza predeceased Shah Fath Ali.)
Article 8: Persian ships lost full rights to navigate all of the Caspian Sea and its coasts, which were given to Russia.
Persia recognised capitulation rights for Russian subjects in Persia.
Article 10: Russia gained the right to send consular envoys anywhere in Persia.
Article 10: Both parties accept commercial treaties with detailed conditions.
Article 13: Prisoners-of-war were exchanged.
Persia officially apologised for breaking its promises made in the Treaty of Gulistan.
Article 15: Shah Fath Ali Shah promised not to charge or persecute any inhabitant or official in the region of Iranian Azerbaijan for any deed carried out during the war or during the temporary control of the region by Russian troops. In addition, all inhabitants of the aforementioned district were given the right to move from Persian districts to Russian districts within one year.

Article 15 provided for the resettlement of Armenians from Iranian Azerbaijan to the Caucasus, which also included an outright liberation of Armenians taken captive by Persia since 1804 or 1795. This resettlement replaced the 20,000 Armenians who moved to Georgia between 1795 and 1827.

Aftermath 
According to Prof. Alexander Mikaberidze:

According to the Cambridge History of Iran: 

In combination with the 1813 Treaty of Gulistan, some authors have claimed that the two resulting Iranian territorial cessions separated the Azerbaijani people and the Talysh people from their brethren in Iran. Following the two treaties, the formerly Iranian territories came under the Russian, and later the Soviet control for approximately 180 years, and Dagestan remains a constituent republic within the Russian Federation to this day. Comprising most of the territory ceded in Gullistan and Turkmenchay treaties, three separate nations would gain independence following the dissolution of the Soviet Union in 1991: Georgia, Azerbaijan and Armenia.

Repatriation of Armenians 

By virtue of the 15th term of the Treaty of Turkmenchay, Armenians from the Azerbaijan Province were given the freedom to emigrate to Russian-controlled territory north of the Aras river. In the period 1828–1831 following Russia's annexation, 45,000 Armenians from Iran and 100,000 from the Ottoman Empire immigrated to Russian Armenia. Beginning in October 1829, 7,668 families immigrated to Russian Armenia; ultimately, 14,047 families consisting of 90,000–100,000 people had immigrated.

Massacre at Russian embassy 
In the aftermath of the war and the signing of the treaty, anti-Russian sentiment in Persia was rampant. On 11 February 1829, an angry mob stormed the Russian embassy in Tehran and killed almost everyone inside. Among those killed in the massacre was the newly-appointed ambassador to Persia, Aleksander Griboyedov, a celebrated Russian playwright. Griboyedov had played an active role in negotiating the terms of the treaty.

See also 
 Armenia–Iran border
 Azerbaijan–Iran border
 Anglo-Russian Convention
 Iran–Russia relations
 List of treaties
 Treaty of Akhal
 Treaty of Gulistan

Notes

Sources 

 H. Pir Nia, Abbas Eghbal Ashtiani, B. Agheli. History of Persia. Tehran, 2002. p. 673-686.

External links 

  Text of the Treaty of Turkmenchay

Turkmenchay
Turkmenchay
1820s in Iran
19th century in Armenia
19th century in Azerbaijan
History of Iğdır Province
Turkmenchay
19th century in the Russian Empire
Turkmenchay
Turkmenchay
Iran–Russia relations
Russo-Persian Wars
1828 in Europe
February 1828 events
Iran–Russia treaties